Centrolepis eremica is a species of plant in the Restionaceae family and is found in Western Australia.

It blooms between July and September.

It is found amongst boulders and the margins of watercourses in the Wheatbelt, Mid West and Goldfields-Esperance regions of Western Australia where it grows in sandy-clay-loam granitic soils.

References

eremica
Plants described in 1986
Flora of Western Australia
Poales of Australia